Galectin-2 is a protein that in humans is encoded by the LGALS2 gene.

The protein encoded by this gene is a soluble beta-galactoside binding lectin. The encoded protein is found as a homodimer and can bind to Lymphotoxin alpha. A single nucleotide polymorphism in an intron of this gene can alter the transcriptional level of the protein, with a resultant increased risk of myocardial infarction.

References

Further reading